Ilavia was an airline based in Moscow, Russia, which operated chartered flight services within Russia and to other CIS destinations.

History
The airline was founded in 1994, originally to deliver food and materials to remote Russian towns. It was owned by Aerotrans Airlines (90 percent), with the remaining shares being held by the Ilyushin Aviation Complex. On 15 March 2005, Ilavia had its airline licence withdrawn.

Fleet
The Ilavia fleet consisted of the following aircraft (at January 2005):
2 Ilyushin Il-76MD
4 Ilyushin Il-76TD

References

Defunct airlines of Russia
Airlines established in 1994
Airlines disestablished in 2005
Companies based in Moscow
1994 establishments in Russia